The 1912 Delaware gubernatorial election was held on November 5, 1912. Though Republican Governor Simeon S. Pennewill was eligible for re-election, State Senator Charles R. Miller was nominated by the state Republican convention. With the nationwide rise of the Progressive Party, Delaware Republicans were keen to not lose the race due to a strong showing by a Progressive candidate; Miller was seen as amenable to all factions of the Republican Party and to Progressives. In the general election, Miller faced Democratic nominee Thomas M. Monaghan, who had been elected as State Senate President in a majority-Republican chamber as the result of a coalition agreement with Progressives, and Progressive nominee George B. Hynson.

With three strong candidates running, the general election was close. Miller ended up narrowly winning, continuing the Republicans' winning streak in the state, but he defeated Monaghan by only 1,285 votes, winning with a bare plurality. Miller received 47% of the vote to Monaghan's 44% and Hynson's 6%.

General election

References

Bibliography
 Delaware Senate Journal, 94th General Assembly, 1st Reg. Sess. (1913).

1912
Delaware
Gubernatorial
November 1912 events